Dink, the Little Dinosaur is an American animated series created by Karen Willson and Chris Weber, produced by Ruby-Spears Enterprises. The series originally aired as part of CBS's Saturday morning line-up from 1989 to 1990.

Plot
The series followed Dink, a dinosaur, and his four friends as they explore and dwell in the volcanic landscape of prehistory in a place called Green Meadow. Designed to help children navigate the world of friendship and making friends, the stories fostered positive behaviors such as caring about oneself and others, tolerance, ecology, problem-solving and teamwork.

The second season introduced a weekly segment called "Factasaurus" that taught lessons and fun facts educating children about different dinosaur species.

Characters

Episodes

Season 1 (1989)

Season 2 (1990)

Cast 
 R.J. Williams - Dink
 Anndi McAfee - Amber
 Ben Ryan Ganger - Shyler
 Frank Welker - Scat,  Crusty 
 S. Scott Bullock - Flapper

Additional  cast 
 Jack Angel - Hubble
 Richard Beals -   Scratcher
 Michael Bell -   Beast
 Joey Camen -   Tiny
 Hamilton Camp -   Uncle Longbeak
 Jodi Carlisle -   Brighteyes
 Nancy Cartwright -   Jane 
 Cam Clarke -  Forest
 Townsend Coleman -   Shortspike's  father 
 Brian Cummings -   narrator 
 Jim Cummings - Trubble, Fleetfoot,     Shortspike 
 Jennifer Darling - Ariel
 Debi Derryberry -   Ariel's  mother 
 Billie Hayes - Buttercup
 Dana Hill - Dippo,   Stormfoot 
 Hal Rayle -    Trail blazer 
 Steve Schatzberg -    Mike 
 Kath Soucie -   Melodi 
 Russi Taylor - Squirt 
 Janet Waldo -     Miss mike 
 Frank Welker - Earthshaker, Scavenger, Bolderbuns,    Tyrannor,     Slidetooth,     Bilal,      Johnny

Home media

VHS release
Five years after its television broadcast, Dink, the Little Dinosaur was released on VHS by Turner Home Entertainment under the Hanna-Barbera label on September 14, 1994. Its six volumes are Land Of No Return, Shyler's Friend, The Sky Is Falling, Lights Out, Rivals and Phantom Of The Cave. Each Dink videocassette contains over five episodes from the series. Turner also distributed these videos internationally in different countries such as the United Kingdom through First Independent Films, in Australia through Rainbow Products, and in Germany through Fox Video.

DVD release
Warner Archive released the complete series on October 10, 2017 in Region 1.

References

External links
 

1989 American television series debuts
1991 American television series endings
Television series by Ruby-Spears
Animated television series about children
Animated television series about dinosaurs
American children's animated adventure television series
CBS original programming
1980s American animated television series
1990s American animated television series
English-language television shows
Apatosaurinae